Buddhism is not officially recognized as a religion in Slovakia. The 2013 census findings included Buddhism under "other religions,".There are 59000 Buddhist in Slovakia

Various Buddhist schools, including all three traditional vehicles (Theravada, Mahayana and Vajrayana), are active as either informal groups or civil associations. Theravada is represented by groups of vipassana practitioners. Several Zen schools, including disciples of Sando Kaisen and the Korean Kwan Um School, represent the Mahayana. Vajrayana schools include Nyingma practitioners following Namkai Norbu Rinpoche. The Diamond Way organisation founded and directed by Ole Nydahl is also active in Slovakia.

History

Demographic

References 

Sweden, Buddhism in
Religion in Slovakia
Slovakia